Lucien Lazaridès (Athens, Greece, 30 December 1922 — Cannes, 19 July 2005) was a French professional road bicycle racer. Lazaridès was born with Greek nationality but became French in 1929. Lucien Lazaridès was an older brother of cyclist Apo Lazaridès. Lazaridès won the Dauphiné Libéré in 1949 and reached the podium of the Tour de France in 1951. Later in his career he won two Tour de France stages.

Major results

1949
Nice - Mont Agel
Critérium du Dauphiné Libéré
1951
Tour de France:
3rd place overall classification
1954
Tour de France:
Winner stage 17
1955
Tour de France:
Winner stage 10

External links 

Official Tour de France results for Lucien Lazarides

French male cyclists
1922 births
2005 deaths
French Tour de France stage winners
Greek emigrants to France
Sportspeople from Athens
Sportspeople from Pas-de-Calais
Cyclists from Hauts-de-France